Vitaly Aleksandrovich Petrov (born 8 September 1984) is a Russian racing driver who drove in Formula One for Renault F1 Team in 2010, Lotus Renault GP in 2011 and Caterham F1 Team in 2012. Born in Vyborg, he is known as the "Vyborg Rocket". He was the first Russian to compete in the Formula One World Championship.

Early career

Unlike most top drivers, Petrov did not begin his career in karting, as there was very little motorsport where he lived. He began competing in motorsport in 1998, when he took part in rally sprints and ice races. Afterwards he began competing in the Russian Lada Cup in 2001 and gained  as his manager in 2001. He remained in the series for 2002 dominating the championship, winning each round to amass the maximum points total of 500.

In 2003, Petrov began racing in the Formula Renault championships. His main campaign was in the Italian Formula Renault Championship for Euronova Racing, finishing 19th overall. During the year he competed in several rounds of the Eurocup Formula Renault 2.0, the Formula Renault 2.0 UK series, and finished fourth in the British Formula Renault Winter Series at the end of the year, taking one win. He also made his debut in Euro Formula 3000 at Cagliari.

In 2004, Petrov turned his attention to the inaugural season of the Russian Lada Revolution championship. He started every race from pole position, but finished as runner-up. He also made selected appearances in Formula Renault and Euro F3000. Petrov remained in Russia for 2005, winning the Lada Revolution Championship with ten wins and the Russian Formula 1600 series with five wins.

European series

In 2006, Petrov raced in Euroseries 3000 with Euronova Racing. He finished third in the standings, scoring nine podiums in eighteen races including four wins at Hungaroring, Mugello Circuit, Silverstone Circuit and Circuit de Catalunya. Also he participated in the Brno round of the 2006 F3000 International Masters season, where he took a pole position. During the 2006 season Petrov made his debut in the GP2 Series for David Price Racing. He replaced French driver Olivier Pla, who lost his sponsorship from Direxiv in the team from the German round onwards.

In 2007 he moved to Campos Grand Prix, where he joined Giorgio Pantano. He scored five-point-scoring positions from 21 races and took his first victory at Valencia on his way to finishing 13th in the standings. He competed in several Le Mans Series races throughout the year, including the 24 Hours of Le Mans in a Courage Compétition LMP2 car. The car completed 198 laps before retiring from the race, being classified in 38th.

Petrov finished in third position with one win at Sepang International Circuit in the 2008 GP2 Asia Series season for Campos, behind champion Romain Grosjean and Sébastien Buemi. In the main series Petrov remained with the Campos team. He finished seventh in final standings, taking a win at the Valencia Street Circuit. He finished fifth, with a win in the Sepang sprint race, in the 2008–09 GP2 Asia Series season for Campos.

He stayed with the team for 2009, now rebranded as Barwa Addax, and finished as runner-up to the dominant Nico Hülkenberg in the championship, winning twice at Istanbul Park and Valencia Street Circuit.

Formula One

Renault (2010–2011)

2010

Petrov was linked to joining Sauber, Renault F1 and Campos for the  season. He was announced as a Renault driver on 31 January and thus became the first Russian driver in the Formula One World Championship. He was signed for a one-year deal, with an option for a further two. He was very close to signing for Campos but he felt Renault was the best option for him. He also mentioned that he had no major sponsors from Russia backing him just his dad and some of his friends. Some of his dad's friends included Vladimir Putin who drove the Renault F1 car and on 4 January 2011 revealed that Sergei Chemezov of Rostec and Leonid Mikhelson of Novatek would provide financial assistance to the Renault F1 team and its driver Petrov. Previously, on 1 March 2010, Carlos Ghosn met with Putin to announce that Renault F1 would have Petrov as its driver after Petrov's manager, had sent a letter to Putin asking Putin for assistance. Alexander Petrov, Vitaly's father, admitted that his best friend "Antiquary" or Ilya Traber, who is the leader of the Vyborg Russian Mafia and is a close friend of Putin, is a major sponsor of the Renault F1 team and its driver Vitaly Petrov, too. Petrov stated that his goal is to start scoring points by mid-season. His teammate for his debut season with the new Renault R30 car was Robert Kubica. After qualifying seventeenth, Petrov's first race ended prematurely when the team found his right-front suspension strut to be damaged, which the Russian suspected to have been caused by hitting a kerb too hard. He had been chasing Rubens Barrichello for tenth place and a World Championship point at the time of the incident.

This race was also noted for his overtakes of Michael Schumacher and Mark Webber under heavy rain. After qualifying for the  he started ninth. But after a collision with Fernando Alonso in the closing laps, he suffered a puncture and was forced to make a pitstop. On returning to the track he set the fastest lap of the race, finishing fifteenth.

In Hungary, Petrov qualified seventh, ahead of much respected teammate Robert Kubica. He finished in 5th place, his highest finish to date, while in Belgium, Petrov started in 23rd place, after failing to set a time in qualifying because of a first-session crash. He made up 14 places in changeable conditions to finish 9th, resulting in his third consecutive points finish. He qualified tenth for the final round of the season in Abu Dhabi, ahead of Kubica who qualified eleventh. In the race, Petrov pitted under an early safety car period which moved him up the order when drivers ahead of him pitted. Fernando Alonso and Mark Webber both came out behind him and Petrov remained ahead of them until the end of the race, which stopped the title contenders' progress and enabled Sebastian Vettel to win the title.

2011

On 22 December 2010, he was retained by the team on a two-year deal. During the close season, the team were rebranded 'Lotus Renault GP' following a sponsorship deal with Lotus Cars. Teammate Robert Kubica suffered serious injuries in a rallying accident, with Petrov being joined by Nick Heidfeld for the start of the season.

In the first race of the season in Australia, Petrov qualified sixth – a career-best – and secured his first Formula One podium, finishing in third place behind race-winner Sebastian Vettel and Lewis Hamilton. In Malaysia, Petrov again ran in the points until he ran wide at a corner and left the circuit; attempting to rejoin, he hit a bump caused by a drainage gully which launched his car into the air and broke the steering column on landing. As a result, he could not compete in Q3, leaving him to start tenth on the grid. He drove a consistent race and made good strategy calls and made his way to ninth after passing several cars after his last stop of a two stop strategy on Lap 37. An eighth place in Turkey added to his points tally before an eleventh-place finish in Spain.

In Monaco, Petrov was taken to hospital after a crash, from sixth place, involving Adrian Sutil, Lewis Hamilton and Jaime Alguersuari. The crash halted the race for 20 minutes before it eventually restarted. He was released from hospital the same day, and returned to the cockpit with a fifth-place finish in Canada. Petrov had a difficult weekend in Valencia, where he finished 15th, having started from 11th on the grid. In Germany, Petrov returned to Q3 for the first time since Canada before finishing ninth. Petrov qualified seventh at Monza, but while battling with Nico Rosberg on the first lap, the HRT of Vitantonio Liuzzi crashed into the side of both of them, eliminating all three cars. Renault suffered their worst performance of the season in Singapore, where Petrov qualified in 18th and finished 17th, before a ninth-place finish in Japan.

It became the third contact between the pair in 2011, when Petrov appeared to be too involved in trying to outbrake Alonso on the long straight before Turn 3. He incurred a five-place grid penalty for the incident at the inaugural , which meant that he had to start the race from sixteenth place. He finished the race eleventh, just in front of teammate Bruno Senna, and just missing out on the points-scoring positions. After finishing 13th in Abu Dhabi, Petrov launched an attack on his team in an interview on Russian television, citing lack of development, strategy mistakes, and criticisms of the drivers by team management. Petrov apologised for the outburst with an email to all Renault staff, with Éric Bouiller claiming the matter was closed. Petrov ended the season with a tenth-place finish in Brazil, but with Adrian Sutil finishing sixth in the race, Sutil moved ahead of Petrov for ninth place in the final championship standings.

Caterham (2012)

On 17 February it was announced that Petrov would drive for the Caterham F1 Team in 2012, replacing Italian Jarno Trulli and partnering Heikki Kovalainen. In Malaysia, Petrov drove a clean race to finish 16th, ahead of Kovalainen. It became apparent that the Caterham lacked the pace of midfield cars, but was evidently faster than Marussia and HRT.

Petrov had another clean race at the  where he qualified in 20th, and made his way up through the race to finish 18th, again ahead of Kovalainen who lost two laps in the pits.

The  was the first time Petrov had qualified ahead of his teammate by just under two-tenths, however, he finished behind him for the first time in the season. The  was a bad run for Petrov, after qualifying nearly nine-tenths down from Kovalainen, he retired from the race on lap 15 with electrical failure, giving him his second retirement of the season.

After starting the race on the tenth row of the grid, Petrov ran as high as tenth at the  – a result that would have earned Caterham their first Formula One point – but was involved in a collision with Daniel Ricciardo and finished thirteenth.

After initially being outpaced by Kovalainen, once Petrov had adjusted to the car he began to turn the tables on his Finnish teammate. He finished ahead of Kovalainen in four of the last five races of the season.

In the final race of the season in Brazil, Petrov finished a season's best eleventh, making a crucial pass on Marussia's Charles Pic in the closing stages of the Grand Prix. The result meant Caterham moved back ahead of Marussia to claim 10th place in the Constructors' Championship, a position worth millions of pounds more in prize money. 

Petrov was not retained by Caterham as the team replaced both him and Kovalainen with Charles Pic and Giedo van der Garde for the 2013 season.

DTM 

Petrov signed with Mercedes to drive in the German touring car series DTM. But after a scoreless season and finishing last in the Drivers' Championship, he left the sport after one year.

Personal life
In 2007, he began residing in Valencia, Spain where he lived while he was a F1 driver.

Petrov voiced a character based on himself in the Russian release of the 2011 Pixar film Cars 2.

Petrov's brother Sergei is a music composer graduated from Vienna's Conservatory. Petrov's father Aleksandr was an influential businessman and municipal deputy in his home city of Vyborg before he was assassinated in 2020 – his death requiring Petrov to stand down from his role as a temporary steward at the 2020 Portuguese Grand Prix.

Racing record

Career summary

Complete GP2 Series results
(key) (Races in bold indicate pole position) (Races in italics indicate fastest lap)

Complete GP2 Asia Series results
(key) (Races in bold indicate pole position) (Races in italics indicate fastest lap)

Complete 24 Hours of Le Mans results

Complete Formula One results
(key) (Races in bold indicate pole position) (Races in italics indicate fastest lap)

 Did not finish, but was classified as he had completed more than 90% of the race distance.

Complete Deutsche Tourenwagen Masters results
(key) (Races in bold indicate pole position) (Races in italics indicate fastest lap)

† Driver did not finish, but was classified as he had completed 75% of the race distance.

Complete FIA World Endurance Championship results
(key) (Races in bold indicate pole position) (Races in italics indicate fastest lap)

Complete European Le Mans Series results

Notes

References

External links

 
 

1984 births
Living people
Sportspeople from Vyborg
Russian expatriate sportspeople in Spain
Russian racing drivers
British Formula Renault 2.0 drivers
Formula Renault Eurocup drivers
Italian Formula Renault 2.0 drivers
GP2 Series drivers
Auto GP drivers
24 Hours of Le Mans drivers
International Formula Master drivers
Russian Formula One drivers
Renault Formula One drivers
Caterham Formula One drivers
GP2 Asia Series drivers
European Le Mans Series drivers
International GT Open drivers
Deutsche Tourenwagen Masters drivers
Eurotek Motorsport drivers
Euronova Racing drivers
David Price Racing drivers
Charouz Racing System drivers
Campos Racing drivers
Mücke Motorsport drivers
SMP Racing drivers
Manor Motorsport drivers
Mercedes-AMG Motorsport drivers